The Children and Young Persons Act 1933 (23 & 24 Geo.5 c.12) is an Act of the Parliament of the United Kingdom of Great Britain and Northern Ireland. It consolidated all existing child protection legislation for England and Wales into one act.  It was preceded by the Children and Young Persons Act 1920 and the Children Act 1908.  It is modified by the Children and Young Persons Act 1963, the Children and Young Persons Act 1969 and the Children and Young Persons Act 2008.

Content 

The Children and Young Persons Act 1933 raised the minimum age for execution to eighteen, raised the age of criminal responsibility from seven to eight, included guidelines on the employment of school-age children, set a minimum working age of fourteen, and made it illegal for adults to sell cigarettes or other tobacco products to children. The act is worded to ensure that adults and not children are responsible for enforcing it.

In 1932 a 16 year juvenile Harold Wilkins was sentenced to death for murder, though the death sentence was commuted.

History 

The act was passed a year after the Children and Young Persons Act 1932 broadened the powers of juvenile courts and introduced supervision orders for children at risk.

Some sections of the act concerning the employment of children are still in force today.

S39. and 49 of the Act remains in everyday use in order to protect the identity of juvenile defendants appearing in Courts in England and Wales.

Section 39 and 49: information for journalists

Sections 39 and 49 are used to protect the identity of children and young people who appear in court as witnesses, victims and suspects. Journalists may not give the following about the accused:

Their name
Address
School
Still or moving image; or
Any particulars likely to lead to the identification of any person aged under 18 concerned in the proceedings.  
 
The differences between the sections are that Section 39 is discretionary, but section 49 is automatically given in the youth courts. However, it can be waived in the following circumstances:

 If it is counterproductive to the defence of the accused. For example, they need people to come forward to say the accused was at a meeting in London when the crime was committed in Liverpool. Also, if the accused is using a defence of mistaken identity.
 If the police need to trace someone who is accused of an offence that warrants a sentence of 14 years imprisonment or more, the press can publish and broadcast details. There is an unofficial defence to the Contempt of Court Act 1981 that allows for police appeals, which will not be prosecuted if done in reasonable terms.
 If it is in the public interest to identify them, as a warning to others who may commit a similar offence. Especially if an ASBO has been issued to the convicted offender, as the publicity is essential to its enforcement. However, ASBOs were abolished and superseded in 2015.

These only apply once proceedings are activated by an arrest or a summons issued.

References

External links
 

Juvenile law
Youth rights
United Kingdom Acts of Parliament 1933
Children's rights in the United Kingdom
Youth in the United Kingdom